a.k.a. Ehime Matsuyama Athletic Stadium or Ehime Prefectural Sports Park Stadium (愛媛県総合運動公園陸上競技場) is a multi-use stadium in Matsuyama, Ehime, Japan, home of Ehime FC. It is a stadium with four concrete stands around the 8-lane athletic track and the grass field. The stadium's capacity is 21,401 people. Since March 2008, Ehime Prefecture sold the naming rights of the stadium to Ningineer Network Co., Ltd., in order to increase revenue for a future renovation of the stadium.

External links

  
Official Site at J. League Web  
Official Site at Ningeneer Corp. Web 

Football venues in Japan
Ehime FC
Sports venues in Ehime Prefecture
Matsuyama, Ehime
Sports venues completed in 1979
1979 establishments in Japan